Ann Noreen Widdecombe  (born 4 October 1947) is a British politician, author and television personality. She was Member of Parliament (MP) for Maidstone and The Weald, and the former Maidstone constituency, from 1987 to 2010 and Member of the European Parliament (MEP) for South West England from 2019 to 2020. Originally a member of the Conservative Party, she was a member of the Brexit Party from 2019 until it was renamed Reform UK in 2021.

Born in Bath, Somerset, Widdecombe read Latin at the University of Birmingham and later studied philosophy, politics and economics at Lady Margaret Hall, Oxford. She is a convert from Anglicanism to Roman Catholicism and was a member of the Conservative Christian Fellowship. She served as Minister of State for Employment from 1994 to 1995 and Minister of State for Prisons from 1995 to 1997. She later served in the Shadow Cabinet of William Hague as Shadow Secretary of State for Health from 1998 to 1999 and Shadow Home Secretary from 1999 to 2001. She was appointed to the Privy Council in 1997.

Widdecombe stood down from the House of Commons at the 2010 general election. Since 2002, she has made numerous television and radio appearances, including as a television presenter. A prominent Eurosceptic, in 2016 she supported the Vote Leave campaign to withdraw the United Kingdom from the European Union (EU). Widdecombe returned to politics as the lead candidate for the Brexit Party in South West England at the 2019 European Parliament election, winning the seat in line with results nationally, serving until the country left the EU on 31 January 2020. In the general election of December 2019 – as with all other candidates for the Commons fielded by the Brexit Party – she did not win the seat she contested (Plymouth Sutton and Devonport), but retained her deposit and came third.

Ideologically, Widdecombe identifies herself as a social conservative and stresses the importance of traditional values and conservatism. As a member of the House of Commons, she was known for opposing the legality of abortion, her opposition to LGBT legal rights such as an equal age of consent and the repeal of Section 28, her support for the retention of blasphemy laws and re-introduction of the death penalty, albeit applicable to a narrower class of murders than previously applied. She has a history of supporting rigorous laws on animal protection and opposition to fox hunting.

Early life
Born in Bath, Somerset, Widdecombe is the daughter of Rita Noreen (née Plummer; 1911–2007) and Ministry of Defence civil servant James Murray Widdecombe. Widdecombe's maternal grandfather, James Henry Plummer, was born to a Catholic family of English descent in Crosshaven, County Cork, Ireland in 1874.

She attended the Royal Naval School in Singapore, and La Sainte Union Convent School in Bath. She then read Latin at the University of Birmingham and later attended Lady Margaret Hall, Oxford, to read philosophy, politics and economics. In 1971, she was the secretary of the Oxford Union for one term, and became its treasurer for one term in 1972; she never became president. While studying at Oxford, she lived next door to Mary Archer, Edwina Currie, and Gyles Brandreth's wife Michèle Brown. She worked for Unilever (1973–75) and then as an administrator at the University of London (1975–87) before entering Parliament.

Political career
In 1974, Widdecombe was personal assistant to Michael Ancram in the February and October general elections of that year. From 1976 to 1978, Widdecombe was a councillor on Runnymede District Council in Surrey.

She contested the seat of Burnley in Lancashire in the 1979 general election and then, against David Owen, the Plymouth Devonport seat in the 1983 general election. In 1983, she (along with Lady Olga Maitland and Virginia Bottomley) was co-founder of Women and Families for Defence, a group founded in opposition to the anti-nuclear Greenham Common Women's Peace Camp.

Widdecombe was first elected to the House of Commons, for the Conservatives, in the 1987 general election as member for the constituency of Maidstone (which became Maidstone and The Weald in 1997).

In government
Widdecombe joined John Major's government as Parliamentary Under-Secretary of State for Social Security in 1990. In 1993, she was moved to the Department of Employment, and she was promoted to Minister of State the following year. In 1995, she joined the Home Office as Minister of State for Prisons and visited every prison in the UK.

Shadow Cabinet
After the Conservative landslide defeat at the 1997 general election, she served as Shadow Health Secretary between 1998–1999 and later as Shadow Home Secretary from 1999 to 2001 under the leadership of William Hague.

Leadership contest and backbenches
During the 2001 Conservative leadership election, she could not find sufficient support amongst Conservative MPs for her leadership candidacy. She first supported Michael Ancram, who was eliminated in the first round, and then Kenneth Clarke, who lost in the final round. She afterwards declined to serve in Iain Duncan Smith's Shadow Cabinet (although she indicated on the television programme When Louis Met..., prior to the leadership contest, that she wished to retire to the backbenches anyway).

In the 2005 leadership election, she initially supported Kenneth Clarke again. Once he was eliminated, she turned support towards Liam Fox. Following Fox's subsequent elimination, she took time to reflect before finally declaring for David Davis. She expressed reservations over the eventual winner David Cameron, feeling that he did not, like the other candidates, have a proven track record, and she was later a leading figure in parliamentary opposition to his A-List policy. At the October 2006 Conservative Conference, she was Chief Dragon in a political version of the television programme Dragons' Den, in which A-list candidates were invited to put forward a policy proposal, which was then torn apart by her team of Rachel Elnaugh, Oliver Letwin and Michael Brown.

In an interview with Metro in September 2006 she stated that if Parliament were of a normal length, it was likely she would retire at the next general election. She confirmed her intention to stand down to The Observer'''s Pendennis diary in September 2007, and again in October 2007 after Prime Minister Gordon Brown quashed speculation of an autumn 2007 general election.

In November 2006, she moved into the house of an Islington Labour Councillor to experience life on a council estate, her response to her experience being "Five years ago I made a speech in the House of Commons about the forgotten decents. I have spent the last week on estates in the Islington area finding out that they are still forgotten."

Widdecombe was one of the 98 MPs who voted to keep their expense details secret. When the expenses claims were leaked, however, Widdecombe was described by The Daily Telegraph as one of the "saints" amongst all MPs.

In May 2009, following the resignation of Michael Martin as Speaker of the House of Commons, it was reported that Widdecombe was gathering support for election as interim Speaker until the next general election. On 11 June 2009, she confirmed her bid to be the Speaker. She made it through to the second ballot but came last and was eliminated.

Widdecombe retired from politics at the 2010 general election. It was rumoured that she would be a Conservative candidate for Police and Crime Commissioner in 2012, but she refused. She has since spoken about her opposition to the Coalition Government and her surprise at not being given a peerage by David Cameron.

In 2016, she supported Brexit during the 2016 EU referendum and, following the resignation of David Cameron, endorsed Andrea Leadsom in her candidacy for election for the leadership of the governing Conservative Party.

Return to politics – Brexit Party
In 2019 she returned to politics as a candidate for the Brexit Party in the European parliament elections in South West England, which were held on 23 May, though she maintained that she would still vote for the Conservatives in the local elections that took place three weeks before. She was expelled by the Conservative Party immediately after her announcement. Widdecombe had considered joining the Brexit Party in March 2019, but joined later, in May.

Widdecombe said that her decision to stand resulted from the Government's failure to deliver Britain's departure from the EU on schedule. "Both major parties need a seismic shock," she said, "to see the extent of public disgust." She subsequently won her seat.

Widdecombe became a member of the European Parliament Committee on Civil Liberties, Justice and Home Affairs (LIBE).

Widdecombe stood as a candidate for Plymouth Sutton and Devonport in the 2019 UK general election, coming a distant third but retaining her deposit with 5.5% of the vote. Nigel Farage said that she was told by the Conservative Party that she would be part of their Brexit negotiations if she stood down as a candidate.

Political views
Social issues
As an MP, Widdecombe expressed socially conservative views, including opposition to abortion; it was understood during her time in frontline politics that she would not become Health Secretary as long as this involved responsibility for abortions. Although a committed Christian, she has characterised the issue as one of life and death on which her view had been the same when she was agnostic and was a member of the Society for the Protection of Unborn Children while studying at Oxford. During Parliament, Widdecombe was a member of the Pro-Life All Party Parliamentary Group, which met with SPUC over concerns the organisation's more strident approach to abortion policy could alienate Protestant and atheist supporters.

She converted from the Church of England to the Roman Catholic Church following the decision of the Church of England on the ordination of women as priests.

Criminal justice
In her speech at the 2000 Conservative conference, she called for a zero tolerance policy of prosecution, with the punishment of £100 fines for users of cannabis. This was well received by rank-and-file Conservative delegates.

Over the years, Widdecombe has expressed her support for a reintroduction of the death penalty, which was abolished in the UK in 1965. She notably spoke of her support for its reintroduction for the worst cases of murder in the aftermath of the murder of two 10-year-old girls from Soham, Cambridgeshire, in August 2002, in the Soham murders. She supported the argument that the death penalty would have deterrent value, as within five years of its abolition the national murder rate had more than doubled.

Environmental and science issues
She is a committed animal lover and one of the several Conservative MPs to have consistently voted for the ban on the hunting of foxes. Widdecombe was among more than 20 high-profile people who signed a letter to Members of Parliament in 2015 to oppose David Cameron's plan to amend the Hunting Act 2004.

In 2007, she wrote that she did not want to belittle the issue of climate change, but was sceptical of the claims that specific actions would prevent catastrophe. In 2008, she wrote that her doubts had been "crystalised" by Nigel Lawson's book An Appeal to Reason; in 2014, she likened Lawson's difficulty in getting the book published to the book-burnings in Nazi Germany. Later in 2008, Widdecombe claimed that the "science of climate change is robustly disputed",, then, in 2009, that "There is no climate change, hasn't anybody looked out of their window recently?" She was one of the five MPs who voted against the Climate Change Act 2008.

The previous year, she voted to support a parliamentary motion supporting homeopathy, disagreeing with the Science and Technology Committee's Report on the subject.

LGBT rights
Widdecombe supported the partial decriminalisation of homosexuality in 1967 in England and Wales. After that, Widdecombe consistently opposed further reforms while in Parliament. Out of the 17 parliamentary votes between 1998 and 2008 considered by the Public Whip website to concern equal rights for homosexuals, Widdecombe took the opposing position in 15 cases, not being present at the other two votes. In 1999, Widdecombe stated that "I do not think that [homosexuality] can be promoted as an equally valid lifestyle to [heterosexual] marriage, but I would say the same about irregular heterosexual arrangements."

She has consistently argued against an equal age of consent for same-sex relationships, voting against a 1994 act (which would have reduced the age of consent for some male-male sexual activity from 21 to 18), secondly in 1998 (arguing against a further reduction from 18 to 16, which later occurred in 2000). On the latter act, she wrote in The Mail on Sunday that "one of the sundry horrors for which this Government is likely to be remembered will be that it gave its imprimatur to sodomy at 16", She later said in 2000: "I do not believe that issues of equality should override the imperatives of protecting the young." In 2003, Widdecombe opposed the repeal of Section 28 of the Local Government Act 1988. In 2012, Widdecombe voiced support in the Daily Express for the practise of conversion therapy, which claims to change the orientation of homosexuals.

Widdecombe has also expressed her opposition to same-sex marriage, introduced by David Cameron's government in 2014, arguing that "the state must have a preferred model" which is "a union that is generally open to procreation". She also opposes gender self-identification for transgender people. In 2020, she expressed her opposition to same-sex dancing on Strictly Come Dancing, saying: "I don't think it is what viewers of Strictly, especially families, are looking for. But that's up to the audience and the programme."

Controversies
In 1996, Widdecombe, as prisons minister, defended the Government's policy to shackle pregnant prisoners with handcuffs and chains when in hospital receiving prenatal care. Widdecombe told the Commons that the restrictions were needed to prevent prisoners from escaping the hospital. "Some MPs may like to think that a pregnant woman would not or could not escape. Unfortunately this is not true. The fact is that hospitals are not secure places in which to keep prisoners, and since 1990, 20 women have escaped from hospitals". Jack Straw, Labour's Home Affairs spokesman at the time, said it was "degrading and unnecessary" for a woman to be shackled at any stage.

In May 1997, in the context of an inquiry into a series of prison escapes, Widdecombe remarked of former Home Secretary Michael Howard, under whom she had served, that there is "something of the night" about him.
This much-quoted comment is thought to have contributed to failure of Howard's 1997 campaign for the Conservative Party leadership, a sentiment shared by both Howard himself and Widdecombe. It led to him being caricatured as a vampire, in part due to his Romanian ancestry.  Extract from Crick's book In search of Michael Howard.  Howard became the official party leader in 2003, and Widdecombe then stated, "I explained fully what my objections were in 1997 and I do not retract anything I said then. But ... we have to look to the future and not the past."

In 2001, when Michael Portillo was running for leader of the Conservative Party, Widdecombe described him and his allies as "backbiters" due to his alleged destabilising influence under Hague. She went on to say that, should he be appointed leader, she would never give him her allegiance. This was amidst a homophobic campaign led by socially conservative critics of Portillo.

In 2009, she partially defended Carol Thatcher's use of the racial slur golliwog on Any Questions?, saying: "There is a generation to whom a golliwog is merely a toy, a generation which was much endeared by its golliwogs which grew up with them on jam jars ... and there is a generation, a new generation for whom that word is deeply offensive and one does have to make I think some allowance for the fact." In December 2019, leaked WhatsApp conversations to the Plymouth Herald between her and Brexit Party activists showed Widdecombe using the term amid rumours BP campaign funding was being diverted away from Plymouth ahead of the general election of that year. Referring to throwing of one's toys out of the pram, Widdecombe said: "Yes, I threw all my toys of the pram. Bears and gollywogs flying everywhere!!".

In 2019 Widdecombe defended the comments she made in a 2012 article that supported "gay conversion" therapy. She told Sky News that science may yet "provide an answer" to the question of whether people can "switch sexuality". Following Widdecombe's apparent endorsement of conversion therapy, at least one venue, the Landmark theatre in Ilfracombe, Devon, cancelled a performance of her one-woman show.

Widdecombe and two other Brexit Party figures were criticised for previous appearances on the David Icke-affiliated Richie Allen Show, which has been accused of promoting Holocaust denial and antisemitic conspiracy theories about the Rothschild family and Zionism. Widdecombe appeared three times between August 2017 and April 2019 and was described as an "old friend of the show" by the host during one appearance. Widdecombe told Jewish Chronicle that she agreed to appear to discuss Brexit, and that she "had never heard of the Richie Allen Show until I agreed to go on" and distanced herself from its antisemitic content by, among other things, pointing to her membership of the Conservative Friends of Israel, B'nai B'rith event speeches, and her novel An Act of Treachery, which she said is set during the Holocaust.

Widdecombe was elected as a Member of the European Parliament for the Brexit Party on 23 May 2019 in the European elections. On 3 July 2019 she used her maiden speech in Strasbourg to compare Brexit to slaves revolting against their owners and to a colonised country rising up against occupying forces, a stance which was criticised by members of both the European Parliament and the British House of Commons.

Media work and appearances

In 2002 she took part in the ITV programme Celebrity Fit Club. Also in 2002 she took part in a Louis Theroux television documentary, depicting her life, both in and out of politics. In March 2004 she briefly became The Guardian newspaper's agony aunt, introduced with an Emma Brockes interview. In 2005 BBC Two showed six episodes of The Widdecombe Project, an agony aunt television programme. In 2005, she appeared in a new series of Celebrity Fit Club, but this time as a panel member dispensing wisdom and advice to the celebrities taking part. Also in 2005, she presented the show Ann Widdecombe to the Rescue in which she acted as an agony aunt, dispensing advice to disputing families, couples, and others across the UK. In 2005, she also appeared in a discussion programme on Five to discuss who had been England's greatest monarch since the Norman Conquest; her choice of monarch was Charles II.

She was the guest host of news quiz Have I Got News for You twice, in 2006 and 2007. Her first appearance as guest host, in 2006, was widely regarded as a success. Following her second appearance, Widdecombe vowed she would never appear on the show again because of comments made by panellist Jimmy Carr. She wrote, "His idea of wit is a barrage of filth and the sort of humour most men grow out of in their teens.... [T]here's no amount of money for which I would go through those two recording hours again. At one stage I nearly walked out." She did, however, stand by her appraisal of regular panellists Ian Hislop and Paul Merton, whom she has called "the fastest wits in showbusiness". Merton later revealed that he thought Widdecombe had been "the worst ever presenter" of the show, particularly on her second appearance where Merton claimed she "thought she was Victoria Wood".

In 2007 she awarded the University Challenge trophy to the winners. In the same year, she appeared in  "The Sound of Drums", the 12th episode of the third series of the science-fiction drama Doctor Who, endorsing the Master's Prime Minister campaign. Since 2007 Widdecombe has fronted a television series called Ann Widdecombe Versus, on ITV1, in which she speaks to various people about things related to her as an MP, with an emphasis on confronting those responsible for problems she wished to tackle. On 15 August 2007 she talked about prostitution, the next week about benefits and the week after that about truancy. A fourth episode was screened on 18 September 2008 in which she travelled around London and Birmingham talking to girl gangs.

In 2009, Widdecombe appeared with Archbishop John Onaiyekan in an "Intelligence Squared" debate in which they defended the motion that the Catholic Church was a force for good. Arguing against the motion were Stephen Fry and Christopher Hitchens, who won the debate overall.

In October 2010, she appeared on BBC One's Strictly Come Dancing, partnered by Anton du Beke, winning the support of some viewers despite low marks from the judges. After nine weeks of routines strongly flavoured by comedy the couple had received enough support in the public vote to stay in the contest. Widdecombe was eliminated from the competition on Sunday 5 December after the public vote had been combined with the judges' score; she was with Scott Maslen of EastEnders in the bottom two. In 2011 Widdecombe played the Lord Mayoress in an episode of Sooty.

In 2012, Widdecombe hosted a new quiz show for the Sky Atlantic channel, called Cleverdicks. The show ran for one series with 30 one-hour episodes. It featured four contestants, usually high quality members of the UK national quiz circuit and ended with a money round for the winner of each show. In April 2012 Widdecombe presented an hour-long documentary for BBC Radio 5 Live, Drunk Again: Ann Widdecombe Investigates, looking at how the British attitude to alcohol consumption has changed over the last few years. It was revealed in October 2012, that the year's Children in Need's appeal night would feature a Strictly Come Dancing special with former show favourites Russell Grant and Widdecombe. On 4 November 2012, Widdecombe guest-hosted one episode of BBC's Songs of Praise programme about singleness.

In October 2014, she appeared in the BBC series Celebrity Antiques Road Trip, partnered with expert Mark Stacey – beating Craig Revel Horwood and Catherine Southon.

Widdecombe took part in a television series 24 Hours in the Past, along with Colin Jackson, Alistair McGowan, Miquita Oliver, Tyger Drew-Honey and Zoe Lucker. The four-part series was aired from 28 April–19 May 2015 on BBC One and involved the celebrities experiencing life as workers in a dustyard, coachhouse, pottery and finally as workhouse inmates in 1840s Britain. She took part in an episode of Tipping Point: Lucky Stars in 2016. In 2017, Widdecombe took part in ITV's Sugar Free Farm.

In January 2018, Widdecombe was the first to enter the Celebrity Big Brother house to participate as a housemate in its twenty-first series. A controversial figure in the house, she was criticised over her comments regarding the Harvey Weinstein controversy as well as comments perceived to be anti-LGBT to her fellow housemates, most notably to drag queen Courtney Act (Shane Jenek). She finished the competition in second place as runner-up to Jenek, who became popular with viewers for challenging Widdecombe's comments.

In 2019 Widdecombe appeared on the new celebrity version of The Crystal Maze, where alongside Sunetra Sarker, Wes Nelson, Matthew Wright and Nikki Sanderson, she won money for the charity Stand Up to Cancer initiative.

In 2020 Widdecombe travelled to Norway for three days to visit Halden Prison, for the documentary,  of The World’s Most Luxurious Prison.Stage acting career
Following her retirement, Widdecombe made her stage debut, on 9 December 2011, at the Orchard Theatre, Dartford in the Christmas pantomime Snow White and the Seven Dwarfs, alongside Strictly Come Dancing judge Craig Revel Horwood. In April 2012, she had a ten-minute non-singing cameo part in Gaetano Donizetti's comic opera La Fille du Regiment, playing the Duchesse de Crackentorp. Widdecombe reprised her pantomime performance, again with Horwood, at the Swan Theatre, High Wycombe in December 2012.

Widdecombe stepped in at short notice to play the Evil Queen in Snow White and the Seven Dwarfs, which was published by the Brothers Grimm in 1812, at Bridlington Spa in December 2016.  She replaced Lorraine Chase, who had been injured in an accident two weeks before rehearsals were due to commence.  This was Widdecombe's first appearance as a pantomime 'baddie'; a role she told the press she had always hoped for.

In December 2017 Widdecombe played the Empress of China in the pantomime Aladdin at the Marina Theatre in Lowestoft. The production was the theatre's most successful pantomime to date.

Personal life and family
Until her retirement following the 2010 general election, Widdecombe divided her time between her two homes – one in London and one in the countryside village of Sutton Valence, Kent, in her constituency. She sold both of these properties, however, upon deciding to retire at the next general election. She shared her home in London with her widowed mother, Rita Widdecombe, until Rita's death, on 25 April 2007, aged 95. In March 2008, she purchased a house in Haytor Vale, on Dartmoor in Devon, where she retired. Her brother, Malcolm (1937–2010), who was an Anglican canon in Bristol, retired in May 2009 and died in October 2010. Her nephew, Roger Widdecombe, is an Anglican priest. She has never married nor had any children. In November 2007 on BBC Radio 4 she described how a journalist once produced a profile on her with the assumption that she had had at least "one sexual relationship", to which Widdecombe replied: "Be careful, that's the way you get sued". When interviewer Jenni Murray asked if she had ever had a sexual relationship, Widdecombe laughed "it's nobody else's business".

In a 2001 report in The Guardian it was claimed that she had a three-year romance while studying at the University of Oxford. Widdecombe herself confirmed the liaison when, in January 2018, she appeared on the UK reality TV show Big Brother, explaining that she had ended the romance in order to prioritise her career.

Widdecombe has a fondness for cats and many other animals such as foxes, and has a section of her website - which is titled the Widdyweb - devoted to all the pet cats with which she has shared her life. Widdecombe also adopted two goats at the Buttercups Goat Sanctuary in Boughton Monchelsea near Maidstone, although one later died. In an interview, Widdecombe talked about her appreciation of music despite describing herself as "pretty well tone-deaf".

Her non-political accomplishments include being a popular novelist. Widdecombe also currently writes a weekly column for the Daily Express.

In January 2011 Widdecombe was President of the North of England Education Conference in Blackpool, and gave a speech there supporting selective education and opposing the ban on new grammar schools being built. She has also become a patron of The Grace Charity for M.E.

Widdecombe revealed, in an April 2012 interview with Matt Chorley of The Independent, that she was writing her own autobiography, which she described as "rude about all and sundry, but an amount of truth is always necessary".

Widdecombe is a Patron of the charity Safe Haven for Donkeys in the Holy Land (SHADH) and in 2014 visited the SHADH Donkey Sanctuary in the West Bank.

Religious views
Widdecombe became an Anglican in her 30s, after a period of being an agnostic following her departure from religious schooling. Widdecombe is now a practising Roman Catholic; she converted in 1993 after leaving the Church of England. Her reasons for leaving the latter were many, as she explained to reporters from the New Statesman:

I left the Church of England because there was a huge bundle of straw. The ordination of women was the last straw, but it was only one of many. For years I had been disillusioned by the Church of England's compromising on everything. The Catholic Church doesn't care if something is unpopular.

In October 2006, she pledged to boycott British Airways for suspending a worker who refused to hide her cross. The matter was resolved when the company reversed the suspension.

In 2010, Widdecombe turned down the offer to be Britain's next ambassador to the Holy See, being prevented from accepting by suffering a detached retina. She was made a Dame of the Order of St. Gregory the Great by Pope Benedict XVI for services to politics and public life on 31 January 2013.

Honours
Widdecombe was appointed an Honorary Fellow of Canterbury Christ Church University at a ceremony held at Canterbury Cathedral on 30 January 2009.
 She was awarded the Honorary degree of Doctor of the University (D.Univ) by the University of Birmingham on 5 July 2012.
: Dame of the Order of St Gregory the Great (DSG) (2013)

Selected publications

Fiction
 2000: The Clematis Tree. London: Weidenfeld & Nicolson 
 2002: An Act of Treachery. London: Weidenfeld & Nicolson 
 2005: Father Figure. London: Weidenfeld & Nicolson 
 2005: An Act of Peace. London: Weidenfeld & Nicolson 

Non-fiction
 1999: Inspired and Outspoken: the collected speeches of Ann Widdecombe; edited by John Simmons, with a biographical preface by Nick Kochan. London: Politico's Publishing 
2004: The Mass is a Mess, with Martin Kochanski. London: Catholic Writers' Guild

Further reading
 2000: Kochan, Nicholas Ann Widdecombe: right from the beginning''. London: Politico's Publishing

Notes

References

External links

 Official Website
 TheyWorkForYou.com – Ann Widdecombe MP
 The Public Whip – Ann Widdecombe MP voting record
 

|-

|-

|-

1947 births
20th-century English women politicians
20th-century English politicians
Female members of the Parliament of the United Kingdom for English constituencies
British broadcaster-politicians
Conservative Party (UK) MPs for English constituencies
Converts to Anglicanism from atheism or agnosticism
Converts to Roman Catholicism from Anglicanism
English Roman Catholics
Female critics of feminism
Living people
Members of the Privy Council of the United Kingdom
People from Bath, Somerset
Television personalities from Somerset
UK MPs 1987–1992
UK MPs 1992–1997
UK MPs 1997–2001
UK MPs 2001–2005
UK MPs 2005–2010
Brexit Party MEPs
Reform UK parliamentary candidates
MEPs for England 2019–2020
21st-century women MEPs for England
Alumni of Lady Margaret Hall, Oxford
People from Sutton Valence
Politicians from Somerset
20th-century Anglicans
20th-century Roman Catholics
21st-century Roman Catholics
British Eurosceptics